Zira Nawan is a village in the Punjab province of Pakistan. It is located at 31°8'7N 72°41'56E, at an altitude of 252 metres (830 feet).

References

Villages in Punjab, Pakistan